, meaning by scripture alone, is a Christian theological doctrine held by most Protestant Christian denominations, in particular the Lutheran and Reformed traditions of Protestantism, that posits the Bible as the sole infallible source of authority for Christian faith and practice. The Catholic Church considers it heterodox and generally the Orthodox churches consider it to be contrary to the 'phronema' of the Church.

While the scriptures' meaning is mediated through many kinds of subordinate authority—such as the ordinary teaching offices of a church, the ecumenical creeds, councils of the Catholic Church, or even personal special revelation— in contrast rejects any infallible authority other than the Bible. In this view, all non-scriptural authority is derived from the authority of the scriptures or is independent of the scriptures, and is, therefore, subject to reform when compared to the teaching of the Bible.

 is a formal principle of many Protestant Christian denominations, and one of the five solae. It was a foundational doctrinal principle of the Protestant Reformation held by many of the Reformers, who taught that authentication of Scripture is governed by the discernible excellence of the text, as well as the personal witness of the Holy Spirit to the heart of each man. Some evangelical and Baptist denominations state the doctrine of  more strongly: Scripture is self-authenticating, clear (perspicuous) to the rational reader, its own interpreter ("Scripture interprets Scripture"), and sufficient of itself to be the final authority of Christian doctrine.

The Methodists thought reason should be delineated from experience, though the latter was classically filed under the former and guided by reason, nonetheless this was added, thus changing the "Anglican Stool" to the four sides of the Wesleyan Quadrilateral. The Eastern Orthodox Church holds that to "accept the books of the canon is also to accept the ongoing Spirit-led authority of the church's tradition, which recognizes, interprets, worships, and corrects itself by the witness of Holy Scripture". The Catholic Church officially regards tradition and scripture as equal, forming a single deposit, and considers the magisterium as the living organ which interprets said deposit. The Roman magisterium thus serves Tradition and Scripture as "one common source [...] with two distinct modes of transmission", while some Protestant authors call it "a dual source of revelation".

Many Protestants  want to distinguish the view that scripture is the only rule of faith with the exclusion of other sources (nuda scriptura), from the view taught by Luther and Calvin that the scripture alone is infallible, without excluding church tradition in its entirety, viewing them as subordinate and ministerial.

History 

In the 14th century, Marsilius of Padua believed that the only authority for a Christian is the scriptures, instead of the pope.

Johann Ruchrat von Wesel, Wessel Gansfort and Johannes von Goch also foreshadowed the Protestant view of : they viewed the scripture as being the only infallible authority and denied the authority of the pope or the church as infallible. Peter Abelard believed that human reason was a means of understanding the scriptures, instead of submitting to everything the Catholic Church defines.

Some elements of sola-scriptura are also foreshadowed by William of Ockham and Girolamo Savonarola.

Overview

 is one of the five , considered by some Protestant groups to be the theological pillars of the Reformation. The key implication of the principle is that interpretations and applications of the scriptures don't have the same authority as the scriptures themselves; hence, the authority of the church is viewed as subject to correction by the scriptures, even by an individual member of the church.

Martin Luther, 16th-century monk and figurehead of the Protestant Reformation, stated that "a simple layman armed with Scripture is greater than the mightiest pope without it". The intention of the Reformation was thus to correct what he asserted to be the errors of the Catholic Church, by appealing to the uniqueness of the Bible's textual authority. Catholic doctrine is based on sacred tradition, as well as scripture.  rejected the assertion that infallible authority was given to the magisterium to interpret both Scripture and tradition.

, however, does not ignore Christian history, tradition, or the church when seeking to understand the Bible. As Luther said, "The true rule is this: God's Word shall establish articles of faith, and no one else, not even an angel can do so."

Characteristics in Lutheranism

Lutheranism teaches that the books of the Old and New Testaments are the only divinely inspired books and the only source of divinely revealed knowledge. Scripture alone is the formal principle of the faith in Lutheranism, the final authority for all matters of faith and morals because of its inspiration, authority, clarity, efficacy, and sufficiency.

Inspiration
Lutheranism teaches that the Bible does not merely contain the Word of God, but every word of it is, because of verbal inspiration, the word of God. Most Lutheran traditions acknowledge that understanding scriptures is complex given that the Bible contains a collection of manuscripts and manuscript fragments that were written and collected over thousands of years. For example, the Evangelical Lutheran Church in America teaches that "Lutheran Christians believe that the story of God's steadfast love and mercy in Jesus is the heart and center of what the Scriptures have to say."

As Lutherans confess in the Nicene Creed, the Holy Spirit "spoke through the prophets". The Apology of the Augsburg Confession identifies "Holy Scripture" with the Word of God and calls the Holy Spirit the author of the Bible. Because of this, Lutherans confess in the Formula of Concord, "we receive and embrace with our whole heart the prophetic and apostolic Scriptures of the Old and New Testaments as the pure, clear fountain of Israel". The apocryphal books were not written by the prophets, by inspiration; they contain errors, were never included in the Palestinian Canon that Jesus used, and therefore are not a part of scripture. The prophetic and apostolic Scriptures are said by the Lutheran church to be authentic as written by the prophets and apostles, and that a correct translation of their writings is God's Word because it has the same meaning as the original Biblical Hebrew and Koine Greek. A mistranslation is not God's word, and no human authority can invest it with divine authority.

Divine authority
Scripture, regarded as the word of God, carries the full authority of God in Lutheranism: every single statement of the Bible calls for instant, unqualified and unrestricted acceptance. Every doctrine of the Bible is the teaching of God and therefore requires full agreement. Every promise of the Bible calls for unshakable trust in its fulfillment; every command of the Bible is the directive of God himself and therefore demands willing observance.

What is said here of "every statement of the Bible" does not represent the faith of all Lutherans: a 2001 survey showed that 72 percent of members of the Evangelical Lutheran Church in America do not accept that everything in the Bible is literal, but that it may contain scientific or historical errors or describe events symbolically.

Clarity

Lutheranism teaches that the Bible presents all doctrines and commands of the Christian faith clearly; that God's word is freely accessible to every reader or hearer of ordinary intelligence, without requiring any special education. It also teaches that readers must understand the language God's word is presented in, and not be so preoccupied by contrary thoughts so as to prevent understanding. It teaches that, consequently, no one needs to wait for any clergy, and pope, scholar, or ecumenical council to explain the real meaning of any part of the Bible.

Efficacy
Lutheranism teaches that scripture is united with the power of the Holy Spirit and with it, not only demands but also creates the acceptance of its teaching. This teaching produces faith and obedience. Scripture is not a dead letter, but rather, the power of the Holy Spirit is inherent in it. Scripture does not compel a mere intellectual assent to its doctrine, resting on logical argumentation, but rather it creates the living agreement of faith. The Smalcald Articles affirm, "in those things which concern the spoken, outward Word, we must firmly hold that God grants His Spirit or grace to no one, except through or with the preceding outward Word".

Sufficiency
Lutheranism teaches that the Bible contains everything that one needs to know in order to obtain salvation and to live a Christian life. There are no deficiencies in scripture that need to be filled with by tradition, pronouncements of the Pope, new revelations, or present-day development of doctrine.

Characteristics in the Reformed faith
The Westminster Confession of Faith spoke of the use of "the ordinary means" (such as turning to pastors and teachers) for reaching an understanding of what is contained in scripture and is necessary to know:
Chapter 1, Section VII. All things in Scripture are not alike plain in themselves, nor alike clear unto all; yet those things which are necessary to be known, believed, and observed, for salvation, are so clearly propounded and opened in some place of Scripture or other, that not only the learned, but the unlearned, in a due use of the ordinary means, may attain unto a sufficient understanding of them.

Prima scriptura

Examples of this include the general revelation in creation, traditions, charismatic gifts, mystical insight, angelic visitations, conscience, common sense, the views of experts, the spirit of the times or something else.  suggests that ways of knowing or understanding God and his will, that do not originate from canonized scripture, are in a second place, perhaps helpful in interpreting that scripture, but testable by the canon and correctable by it, if they seem to contradict the scriptures.

In the Anglican tradition, scripture, tradition, and reason form the "Anglican triad" or "three-legged stool", formulated by the Anglican theologian Richard Hooker. With respect to the Methodist tradition, A Dictionary for United Methodists states:

Sola scriptura rejects any original infallible authority, other than the Bible. In this view, all secondary authority is derived from the authority of the scriptures and is therefore subject to reform when compared to the teaching of the Bible. Church councils, preachers, biblical commentators, private revelation, or even a message allegedly from an angel or an apostle are not an original authority alongside the Bible in the sola scriptura approach.

Scripture and sacred tradition
The Roman Catholic Church, against whom the Protestants directed these arguments, did not see Scripture and the Sacred Tradition of the faith as different sources of authority, but that Scripture was handed down as part of Sacred Tradition (see 2 Thessalonians 2:15, 2 Timothy 2:2).

The Catholic Church holds that the Gospel was transmitted by the apostles by their oral preaching, by example, and by observances handed on what they had received from the lips of Christ, from living with Him, and from what He did, or what they had learned through the prompting of the Holy Spirit; as well as by those apostles and apostolic men who under the inspiration of the Holy Spirit committed the message of salvation to writing. "This living transmission, accomplished in the Holy Spirit, is called Tradition, since it is distinct from Sacred Scripture, though closely connected to it." "Sacred Tradition and Sacred Scripture make up a single sacred deposit of the Word of God."

The Tradition here in question comes from the apostles and hands on what they received from Jesus' teaching and example and what they learned from the Holy Spirit.  (The Catholic Church distinguishes Sacred Tradition from lesser ecclesiastical traditions—local customs that may be retained, modified or even abandoned.) As explained by Athanasius of Alexandria, "Let us look at the very tradition, teaching, and faith of the Catholic Church from the very beginning, which the Logos gave (edoken), the Apostles preached (ekeryxan), and the Fathers preserved (ephylaxan). Upon this the Church is founded (tethemeliotai)"(St. Athanasius, "First Letter to Serapion", 28)

The doctrines which constitute Sacred Tradition are also perceived by the Church as cohesive in nature. The proper interpretation of the Scriptures was seen as part of the faith of the Church and seen indeed as the manner in which biblical authority was upheld (see Book of Acts 15:28–29). The meaning of Scripture was seen as proven from the faith universally held in the churches (see Phil. 2:1, Acts 4:32), and the correctness of that universal faith was seen as proven from the Scriptures and apostolic Sacred Tradition (see 2 Thes. 2:15, 2 Thes. 3:6, 1 Corinthians 11:2). The Biblical canon itself was thus viewed by the Church as part of the Church's tradition, as defined by its leadership and acknowledged by its laity. The first generation of Christians did not yet have a written New Testament, and the New Testament itself demonstrates the process of living Tradition.

The Catholic Dei verbum and the papal encyclicals Providentissimus Deus by Pope Leo XIII and Divino afflante Spiritu by Pope Pius XII set out Catholic teaching on tradition versus individual interpretation.

The Catholic Church teaches that Christ entrusted the preaching of the Gospel to the apostles, who handed it on orally and in writing, and according to the Catechism of the Catholic Church, "the apostolic preaching, which is expressed in a special way in the inspired books, was to be preserved in a continuous line of succession until the end of time. "Sacred Tradition and Sacred Scripture make up a single sacred deposit of the Word of God in which, as in a mirror, the pilgrim Church contemplates God, the source of all her riches." For the Eastern Orthodox too, "the Holy Bible forms a part of Holy Tradition, but does not lie outside of it. One would be in error to suppose that Scripture and Tradition are two separate and distinct sources of Christian Faith, as some do, since there is, in reality, only one source; and the Holy Bible exists and found its formulation within Tradition".

Catholics apply to apostolic tradition many of the qualities that evangelicals and other Protestants apply to scripture alone. For example, the 1978 Evangelical declaration Chicago Statement on Biblical Inerrancy, states: "We affirm that inspiration was the work in which God by His Spirit, through human writers, gave us His Word. The origin of Scripture is divine. The mode of divine inspiration remains largely a mystery to us. We deny that inspiration can be reduced to human insight, or to heightened states of consciousness of any kind."

Since the Catholic Church professes that apostolic tradition and scripture are both the word of God, Catholics can affirm that many of these propositions apply equally well to tradition: It is the work of the Holy Spirit, which cannot be reduced to human insight or heightened consciousness.

This ties in with the question of what constitutes apostolic tradition. The Catechism of the Catholic Church states that this tradition is given "by the apostles who handed on, by the spoken word of their preaching, by the example they gave, by the institutions they established, what they themselves had received - whether from the lips of Christ, from his way of life and his works, or whether they had learned it at the prompting of the Holy Spirit".

There remains some confusion on the matter among both Catholics and non-Catholics. This confusion can be seen in those who interpret Catholic researcher James Keenan to claim that the doctrines given by apostolic tradition have changed. Keenan reviewed the history of moral theology, and in particular a change in the approach of moral theologians, specifically in the twentieth century. Keenan noted that Mark D. Jordan said that medieval texts he had reviewed appeared to be inconsistent. This refers to medieval traditions and not to apostolic tradition or doctrine. Keenan, however, says that John T. Noonan Jr. demonstrated that, "despite claims to the contrary, manualists were co-operators in the necessary historical development of the moral tradition". According to Noonan, "history cannot leave a principle or a teaching untouched; every application to a situation affects our understanding of the principle itself."

Critiques
Following the Protestant churches' separation from the Roman Catholic Church, the relatively new idea of  came under serious critique by the Catholic and Orthodox Christians. In his 2001 The Shape of Sola Scriptura,  the Reformed Christian writer Keith A. Mathison mentions several recent examples of such critics.

The American Roman Catholic author and television presenter Patrick Madrid wrote that  is self-referentially incoherent, as the Bible itself does not teach , and therefore the belief that the scriptures are the only source of Christian belief is self-contradicting given that it cannot be supported without extra-scriptural doctrine.

In the 2008 book Catholicism and Science, the authors Peter M. J. Hess and Paul Allen wrote that  is "inherently divisive", citing the Marburg Colloquy where Martin Luther and Huldrych Zwingli debated the real presence of Christ in the Eucharist on scriptural grounds but were unable to reach agreement on Sacramental Union. Hess and Allen argue that, when scripture is seen as the only source of infallible teaching, its interpretation is subject to fallible interpretation, and without an infallible interpreter, a certainty of Christian belief is not possible.

The Roman Catholic Encyclopedia of Theology notes that, since the 27 books that make up the New Testament canon of scripture are not based on a scriptural list that authenticates them to be inspired, their legitimacy would be impossible to distinguish with certainty without appealing to another infallible source, such as the magisterium of the Catholic Church, which assembled and authenticated this list at Synod of Rome and the Synod of Carthage, both of which took place in the fourth century. Before this, a compiled and authenticated Bible as it is now known did not yet exist.

The American Roman Catholic writer Dave Armstrong wrote that there are several examples of Jesus and his Apostles accepting oral and extrabiblical tradition in the New Testament:
The reference to "He shall be called a Nazarene" cannot be found in the Old Testament, yet it was "spoken by the prophets" (Matthew 2:23). This prophecy, which is considered to be "God's Word", was passed down orally rather than through Scripture. 
In Matthew 23:2–3, Jesus teaches that the scribes and Pharisees have a legitimate, binding authority based "on Moses' seat", but this phrase or idea cannot be found anywhere in the Old Testament. It is found in the (originally oral) Mishnah, which teaches a sort of "teaching succession" from Moses.
In 1 Corinthians 10:4, Paul the Apostle refers to a rock that "followed" the Jews through the Sinai wilderness. The Old Testament says nothing about such miraculous movement. But, this critic writes, rabbinic tradition does.
"As Jannes and Jambres opposed Moses" (2 Timothy 3:8). These two men cannot be found in the related Old Testament passage (cf. Exodus 7:8ff.) or anywhere else in the Old Testament.
In the Epistle of Jude 9, a dispute is mentioned between the Archangel Michael and Satan over Moses' body, which is not mentioned elsewhere in the Bible, and is drawn from oral Jewish tradition.
In the Epistle of James 5:17, when recounting the prayers of Elijah described in 1 Kings 17, a lack of rain for three years is mentioned, which is absent from the passage in 1 Kings.
Armstrong argues that since Jesus and the Apostles acknowledge authoritative Jewish oral tradition, Christians can therefore not dispute oral tradition's legitimacy and authority. However, according to scripture, Jesus also challenges some man-made Jewish traditions. But Catholics also make a similar distinction today between Sacred Tradition, which is considered inerrant, and lesser ecclesiastical traditions or disciplines, which can be subject to change. In the Catholic view, one can know what belongs to Sacred Tradition and what is an ecclesiastical tradition or discipline by consulting the Magisterium of the Church. The difference between the two, in the Catholic view, is that Sacred Tradition is apostolic and part of the deposit of faith, while ecclesiastical traditions and disciplines are not.

See also

 Biblical criticism
 Bibliolatry
 Cessationism versus continuationism
 Christian fundamentalism
 Ex cathedra
 Ibrahim al-Nazzam
 Ijtihad
 Karaite Judaism (an analogous position in Judaism)
 King James Only movement
 Quranism (an analogous position in Islam)

Notes

References

Footnotes

Bibliography

External links
WELS Topical Q&A: Sola Scriptura in the Bible? (a Confessional Lutheran perspective)
WELS Topical Q&A: ? (a Confessional Lutheran perspective)
Scripture & Tradition from a Catholic perspective
Proving Inspiration refers to 
Scripture and Tradition and "What's Your Authority?" argues against 
A Catholic assessment of 
An Orthodox Christian assessment of 
Orthodox Christian Responses to Protestant Apologists on 
"Paradosis: The Handing On of Divine Revelation" from a Catholic perspective
"A Disputation on Holy Scripture" by Puritan William Whitaker (1588)
Citations from the Early Church Fathers on 
 - The Sufficient and Final Authority of the Scriptures, from the Free Brethren House Churches of Christ, a group in the Anabaptist tradition

Five solae
Latin religious words and phrases
Lutheran theology
Christian theology of the Bible
Heresy in Christianity
Christian terminology